Tony Boyle may refer to:

 Tony Boyle (cricketer) (born 1957), New Zealand cricketer
 Tony Boyle (Gaelic footballer) (born 1970), Irish Gaelic footballer
 W. A. Boyle (1904–1985), known as Tough Tony, United Mine Workers of America president later convicted of murder

See also
 Anthony Boyle (born 1994), actor from Northern Ireland